Andrew James Dick (born 25 February 1986 in Carlisle) is an English footballer, who played in the Scottish Football League for Clyde.

References

External links

Living people
1986 births
English footballers
Clyde F.C. players
Falkirk F.C. players
Linlithgow Rose F.C. players
Rangers F.C. players
Scottish Football League players
Scottish Junior Football Association players
Association football midfielders
Camelon Juniors F.C. players
Footballers from Carlisle, Cumbria